Joe Sippel Weir is a weir located on Barambah Creek, west of Murgon, Queensland, Australia. It was constructed downstream of Bjelke-Petersen Dam to help provide water for the surrounding farms. Construction on the stepped weir was completed in 1984.

See also

List of dams and reservoirs in Australia

References

Reservoirs in Queensland
Wide Bay–Burnett
Dams in Queensland
Dams completed in 1984
1984 establishments in Australia